The 2015 Copa do Brasil de Futebol Feminino was the ninth staging of the competition. The competition started on February 4, 2015, and concluded on April 8, 2015. 32 clubs of all regions of Brazil participated of the cup, which was organized by the Brazilian Football Confederation (CBF).

Competition format
The competition was contested by 32 clubs in a knock-out format where all rounds were played over two legs and the away goals rule was used, but in the first two rounds, if the away team won the first leg with an advantage of at least three goals, the second leg would not be played and the club automatically qualified to the next round.

Table

Final

References

External links
Official website

2015
2015 domestic association football cups
Copa